Plectrohyla teuchestes is a species of frog in the family Hylidae. It is endemic to Guatemala and only known with certainty from its type locality on the southern slope of the Sierra de Xucaneb, in the Alta Verapaz Department. There is also a report from another locality in Alta Verapaz. Frogs from Honduras now known as Plectrohyla exquisita were formerly included in this species.
 
Breeding takes place in streams. As of 2004, the only known location was facing habitat loss, and no specimens had been located, despite searches. Chytridiomycosis might also be a threat.

References

teuchestes
Endemic fauna of Guatemala
Amphibians of Guatemala
Frogs of North America
Critically endangered fauna of North America
Amphibians described in 1992
Taxonomy articles created by Polbot